Jennifer M. Toombs was a notable British postage stamp designer.

Jennifer Toombs has designed stamps for at least 70 countries (from the British Virgin Islands to Bahrein, St. Kitts, Malawi, Ethiopia and Bahamas) in some cases she has also designed the cachet for matching First Day Covers and matching pictorial first day of issue postmarks. Her work has become popular with collectors worldwide and is described as "TOOMBSIANA". 
Her career as a stamp designer started when she was 22 years of age with stamps for Lebanon, Nicaragua and Saudi Arabia (1964). After the death of Sir Winston Churchill her stamp designs commemorating the first anniversary of the death of the statesman were adopted for the stamps issued by 33 Commonwealth countries, each issuing a set of 4 stamps: the stamps were released on 24 January 1966 and were printed by the British printery of Harrison & Sons. After this Crown Agents secured her skills for an omnibus series celebrating the 20th Anniversary of UNESCO: 27 countries issued a set of 3 stamps each highlighting important aspects of UNESCO's role: Education, Science and Culture. The omnibus series was issued on 1 December 1966.

During the ensuing years Toombs created a steady stream of stamp designs for the Crown Agents. Her debut on the British Virgin Islands stamp scene took place in 1969: ‘My first“real” design for the BVI was to honour Robert Louis Stevenson, and for this I chose to depict four scenes from Treasure Island, the well-loved adventure story,’ she revealed in an interview published by Gibbons Stamp Monthly in January 2017.
In the same article written by stamp expert Giorgio Migliavacca he stated that "Jennifer Toombs belongs to the Olympus of stamp designers and artists: from Alfred Edward Chalon, to Tommaso Aloisio Juvara, Edmund Dulac, Casimira Dabrowska, Elisabeth von Janota- Bzowski and Czesław Słania, to name a few.", Pictured here is the 1969 4c stamp depicting a pirate ship, Jim Hawkins and Long John Silver; the 4c value of the British Virgin Islands is part of a stamp set of 4 values issued in 1969 designed by Jennifer Toombs.

In 1978–79, Toombs submitted to the UK Post Office Stamp Design Advisory Committee stamp designs honoring four British composers, two of them in a se-tenant format with the stamp at left depicting Henry Purcell on a background featuring the composer's music that last century inspired one of Britten's most loved compositions, the “Variations and Fugue on a Theme of Purcell” also known as ‘The Young Person’s Guide to the Orchestra”. Toombs designs were too sophisticated for the Committee and did not materialize in a stamp issue.
The designer of several hundreds of stamps, covers and pictorial postmarks, Jennifer Toombs has created a steady stream of stamp designs for the Crown Agents. Among them are over 110 Christmas sets and hundreds of stamp designs.
She died on 2 April 2018, aged 77.

Notable issues

 Jamaica 1968 human rights stamps
 Guernsey 1993 Christmas stamps showing the work of Mary Eily de Putron

Saudi Arabia, definitive stamps 1964

Lebanon, 4th Mediterranean Games, 1964

Nicaragua, Antiques (5c to 25c + 60c) 1965

British Commonwealth, Winston Churchill, Omnibus series, 33 countries, 1966

UNESCO 20th Anniv. Omnibus series, 27 countries, 1966

Lesotho, Sahara Rock Paintings (7 values), 1968

British Virgin Islands, Robert Louis Stevenson “Treasure Island”, 1969

Western Samoa, Robert Louis Stevenson 75th Ann. Death, 1969

Pitcairn Islands, Definitive series (13 values), 1969 – 1975

Ethiopia, Ancient Pottery (5 values), 1970

Antigua, St. Helena, Cayman, Br. Virgin Isl. (etc.), Charles Dickens (4 values), 1970

Jersey, Battle of Flowers (4 v.), 1970

Jersey, Wildlife Preservation (4 v.), 1971

British Honduras, Local Hardwoods (4 v. + Miniature Sheet), 1971

Jamaica, Tercentenary of the Post Office (6 v.), 1971
Nicaragua, Christmas (9 v. + Miniature Sheet), 1972
New Hebrides, Orchids (8 v.), 1973
St. Vincent, William Wilberforce (3 v.), 1973

Gibraltar, 500th Birthday of Michelangelo (3 v. + Booklet), 1975

Seychelles, Bicentenary American Revolution (9 values + Miniature Sheet), 1976

Silver Jubilee Queen Elizabeth II Accession to the Throne (Crown Agents Omnibus series of 24 countries), 1977

Silver Jubilee Queen Elizabeth II Coronation (Crown Agents Omnibus series of 9 countries), 1978

St. Kitts, Birds Definitive series (17 values), 1981

Vanuatu, Orchids Definitive series (14 values), 1982

Uganda, Birds (8 values + 2 Miniature Sheets), 1987

Bhutan, Indigenous Birds  (12 values + 12 Miniature Sheets), 1989

The Gambia, African Birds Souvenir Sheet (20 values), 1990

Nevis, Local Birds Souvenir Sheet (20 values), 1991

Malawi, African Birds Souvenir Sheet (20 values), 1992

Sierra Leone, Cats of the World (Souvenir Sheet 12 values + 2 Miniature Sheets), 1993

Jersey, Golf (5 values), 2002
Jersey, 50th Ann. Queen Elizabeth II Coronation (6 values + Souvenir Sheet), 2003

British Virgin Islands, Christmas Plants & Flowers (4 values), 2005

Pitcairn Islands, Charles Darwin (4 values), 2009

References

External links
 Interview with GBBC

British stamp designers
Women stamp designers
British women artists
Women graphic designers
1941 births
2018 deaths